Harg Church is a medieval church in Stockholm County, Sweden. It is part of the Archdiocese of Uppsala (Church of Sweden).

History and architecture
Although built in the 15th century, the church derives its present appearance from a major reconstruction which was carried out in the 18th century. The tower also is not medieval; it dates from 1781 and replaced an earlier church porch. Inside, the church still contains frescos from the 1514, including a large fresco depicting the archangel Michael and the unusual Saint Kakwkylla. The oldest item in the church is the 14th century triumphal cross; most other furnishings date from the 18th century.

References

External links

Buildings and structures in Stockholm County
Churches in the Diocese of Uppsala
Churches converted from the Roman Catholic Church to the Church of Sweden
Church frescos in Sweden